Newcastle Waters is a town and locality off the Stuart Highway in the Northern Territory. The Newcastle Waters School draws most of its few students from the Marlinja homeland community which lies on the northern boundary of the town.

The town of Newcastle Waters is a ghost town that contains a number of preserved historic buildings, including Jones's Store and the Junction Hotel. It is located inside Newcastle Waters Station, a large cattle station with over 40,000 head of cattle.

In 1926, Newcastle Waters was required by the North Australia Act 1926 to be the permanent site of the seat of government for the now-defunct Territory of North Australia. The provisional seat of government for the territory was Darwin, and nothing was done to establish the new capital before the act was repealed by the Northern Territory (Administration) Act 1931.

The 2016 Australian census which was conducted in August 2016 reports that Newcastle Waters had 64 people living within its boundaries.

Newcastle Waters is located within the federal division of Lingiari, the territory electoral division of Barkly and the local government area of the Barkly Region.

References

External links
 The Age Newcastle Waters

Barkly Region
Towns in the Northern Territory
Former Australian capital cities